The 2007 Nigerian Senate election in Anambra State was held on 21 April 2007, to elect members of the Nigerian Senate to represent Anambra State. Annie Okonkwo representing Anambra Central, Ikechukwu Obiorah representing Anambra South and Joy Emodi representing Anambra North all won on the platform of the People's Democratic Party.

Overview

Summary

Results

Anambra Central 
The election was won by Annie Okonkwo of the Peoples Democratic Party (Nigeria).

Anambra South 
The election was won by Joy Emodi of the Peoples Democratic Party (Nigeria).

Anambra North
The election was won by Ikechukwu Obiorah of the Peoples Democratic Party (Nigeria).

References

April 2007 events in Nigeria
Anambra State Senate elections
Ana